Cecil Hills is a suburb of Sydney, in the state of New South Wales, Australia. Cecil Hills is located 38 kilometres west of the Sydney central business district, in the local government area of the City of Liverpool and is part of the Greater Western Sydney region.

History
In 1817, John Wylde, the judge-advocate of New South Wales, was granted  in the Parish of Cabramatta. He named his property Cecil Hills after his British property in Chestnut, Hertfordshire. He lived on the property only briefly before leaving to become Chief Justice of the Cape of Good Hope in South Africa. His wife Elizabeth remained, however, and managed the property until her death in 1864. It continued as a farm through until the 1980s when it was decided to redevelop it for housing. The suburb of Cecil Hills was named in 1992 and includes part of the old Cecil Hills property along with other neighbouring.

In 2019–20, Cecil Hills previously suffered bush fires from fire crackers.

Heritage listings 

Cecil Park has a number of heritage-listed sites, including:
 Sandringham Drive: Cecil Hills Farm

Population
According to the 2021 census, there were 6,906 residents in Cecil Hills. 52.8% of people were born in Australia. The most common other countries of birth were Iraq 9.3%, Vietnam 5.3%, Philippines 2.8%, Cambodia 2.0% and Fiji 1.9%.

In Cecil Hills 37.9% of people only spoke English at home. Other languages spoken at home included Arabic 8.4%, Vietnamese 8.0%, Assyrian Neo-Aramaic 6.8%, Spanish 3.1%, Chaldean Neo-Aramaic 2.9%.

The most common responses for religion were Catholic 41.5%, No Religion 10.5%, Buddhism 9.2%, Islam 6.1% and Eastern Orthodox 6.1%.

Transport
Cecil Hills is located south-west of the intersection of Cowpasture Road and Elizabeth Drive.

Schools
Cecil Hills High School opened in 1996 and it offers a comprehensive curriculum, including English, Mathematics, Science, Geography, History, Commerce, Italian, Music, Visual Arts, Personal Development, Physical Education and Health and a variety of Technology subjects. Sport, School Choir, School Band Program, Computer Technology, Debating and Drama enhance the curriculum.

Houses
The four houses are:
  Chisholm – Green
  Goolagong – Yellow
  Hollows – Red
  Whitlam – Blue

Cecil Hills Public School opened in 2003. Uniform is navy blue and white, with navy blue hats. The school is fairly large, with brick classrooms and demountables. The playground has two basketball/netball courts, a soccer/football field and areas for handball.

See also 

 Cecil Hills High School
 Cecil Hills Farm

References

Suburbs of Sydney